The Battle of Guilford Court House was on March 15, 1781, during the American Revolutionary War, at a site that is now in Greensboro, the seat of Guilford County, North Carolina. A 2,100-man British force under the command of Lieutenant General Charles Cornwallis defeated Major General Nathanael Greene's 4,500 Americans. The British Army, however, suffered considerable casualties (with estimates as high as 27% of their total force).

The battle was "the largest and most hotly contested action" in the American Revolution's southern theater. Before the battle, the British had great success in conquering much of Georgia and South Carolina with the aid of strong Loyalist factions and thought that North Carolina might be within their grasp. In fact, the British were in the process of heavy recruitment in North Carolina when this battle put an end to their recruiting drive. In the wake of the battle, Greene moved into South Carolina, while Cornwallis chose to march into Virginia and attempt to link with roughly 3,500 men under British Major General Phillips and American turncoat Benedict Arnold. These decisions allowed Greene to unravel British control of the South, while leading Cornwallis to Yorktown, where he eventually surrendered to General George Washington and French Lieutenant General Comte de Rochambeau.

The battle is commemorated at Guilford Courthouse National Military Park and associated Hoskins House Historic District.

Prelude

On 18 January, Cornwallis learned he had lost one-quarter of his army at the Battle of Cowpens. Yet he was still determined to pursue Greene into North Carolina and destroy Greene's army. According to Cornwallis, "The loss of my light troops could only be remedied by the activity of the whole corps." At Ramsour's Mill, Cornwallis burned his baggage train, except the wagons he needed to carry medical supplies, salt, ammunition, and the sick. In the words of Charles O'Hara, "In this situation, without Baggage, necessaries, or Provisions of any sort...it was resolved to follow Greene's army to the end of the World." As Cornwallis departed Ramsour's Mill on 28 January, Greene sought to reunite his command but ordered Edward Carrington to prepare for possible retreat across the Dan River into Virginia. In Greene's words, "It is necessary we should take every possible precaution. But I am not without hopes of ruining Lord Cornwallis, if he persists in his mad scheme of pushing through the Country..." On 3 February, Greene joined Daniel Morgan's Continentals at Trading Ford on the Yadkin River, and on 7 February, Lighthorse Harry Lee rendezvoused with the rebel army at Guilford Courthouse. By 9 February, Greene commanded 2036 men, 1426 of whom were regular infantry, whereas Cornwallis had about 2440 men, 2000 of whom were regulars. Now began the "Race to the Dan": Greene's council of war recommended continuing the retreat, opting to fight at a future date and location. By 14 February, Greene's army was safely across the Dan after a retreat that was, according to Tarleton, "judiciously designed and vigorously executed." Cornwallis was now  from his supply base at Camden, South Carolina.  He established camp at Hillsborough and attempted to forage for supplies and recruit Tories. Though Greene's army enjoyed an abundance of food in Halifax County, Virginia, Cornwallis found a "scarcity of provisions," resorted to plundering the farms of the local inhabitants, and lost men "...in consequence of their Straggling out of Camp in search of whiskey." On 19 February, Greene sent Lee's Legion on a reconnaissance mission south across the Dan. By then, according to Buchanan, "Buford's Massacre inflamed rebel passions. Pyle's Massacre devastated Tory morale." On 22 February, Greene moved his army south across the Dan. On 25 February, forced to abandon Hillsborough, Cornwallis moved his camp to the south of Alamance Creek between the Haw River and the Deep River. Greene camped on the north side of the Creek, within  of Cornwallis's camp. By 6 March, Cornwallis's men suffered from hunger. His men plundered tory and rebel inhabitants, and desertions rose, forcing Cornwallis to seek a definitive battle with Greene. Cornwallis had lost almost 400 men through disease, desertion or death, reducing his strength to about 2000 men. On 10 March, Greene was joined by North Carolina militia, led by John Butler and Thomas Eaton, and Virginia militia, led by Robert Lawson. On 12 March, Greene marched his army of about 4440, 1762 of whom were Continentals, to Guilford Courthouse. 

On 14 March, Cornwallis learned that Greene was at Guilford Court House. On 15 March, Cornwallis marched down the road from New Garden toward Guilford Courthouse. Greene had sent Lee's Legion and William Campbell's Virginia riflemen to reconnoiter Cornwallis' camp. At 2 A.M., the rebels noticed Tarleton's movements, and at 4 A.M. Lee's and Tarleton's men made contact. Tarleton started a retreat, while suffering a musket wound to the right hand, and as Lee pursued, Lee came in contact with the British Guards, who forced Lee to retreat.

Battle

Greene had deployed his army in three lines. Greene's first line was along a split-rail fence, where the New Camden road emerged from the woods. On the right was Butler's regiment of 500 North Carolina militia, plus Charles Lynch's 200 Virginia riflemen, William Washington's 90 dragoons, and Robert Kirkwood's 80 man Delaware Line. On the left was Eaton's regiment of 500 North Carolina militia, along with William Campbell's 200 riflemen, and Lee's Legion of 75 horse and 82 foot.  In the middle was a dual six-pounder battery led by Anthony Singleton. Greene's second line was  behind the first:  1200 Virginia militia, led by Robert Lawson and Edward Stevens.  Greene's third line was another  to the right rear, in a clearing:  1400 Continentals, including Isaac Huger's Virginia Brigade, Otho Holland Williams's Maryland Brigade, and Peter Jacquett's Delaware Company. Between the Virginia and Maryland units was a battery of two six-pounders, led by Samuel Finley.

On 15 March, Cornwallis's column appeared along the New Camden Road at 1:30 P.M, and Singleton commenced firing his two six-pounders, while John McLeod's Royal Artillery battery responded with three six-pounders.  According to Buchanan, Cornwallis, "...did not know how many men Greene had. He was ignorant of the terrain too, he also lacked intelligence on Greene's dispositions.  Cornwallis "...had marched hundreds of miles, had driven his army to rags and hunger..." Cornwallis deployed the 33rd Foot and Royal Welsh Fusiliers on his left wing, led by James Webster, and supported by Charles O'Hara with his 2nd Guards Battalion, Grenadiers, and the Jägers. Cornwallis's right wing, led by Alexander Leslie, included the 2nd Battalion of Fraser's Highlanders and Hessian Regiment von Bose, supported by the 1st Guards Battalion. Tarleton's British Legion Horse was in reserve, but Cornwallis lacked Tory auxiliaries.

The British moved forward. The North Carolina militia, according to Singleton, "contrary to custom, behaved well for militia" and fired their volley. Captain Dugald Stuart noted, "One half of the Highlanders dropt on that spot." Thomas Saumarez called it a "most galling and destructive fire." As the British advanced, Sergeant Roger Lamb noted, "...within forty yards of the enemy's line it was perceived that their whole line had their arms presented, and resting on a rail fence...They were taking aim with nice precision. At this awful moment, a general pause took place...then Colonel Webster rode forward in front of the 23rd regiment and said...'Come on, my brave Fuzileers.' This operated like an inspiring voice..." As instructed by Greene, the North Caroline militia retired through Greene's second line. The British now came under enfilading fire from the riflemen and Continentals on their flanks, forcing Cornwallis to order forward his supporting units. On Greene's left, Lee's Legion and Campbell's Virginians retired in a northeasterly direction, instead of straight back, resulting in their fight with the Regiment von Bose and the 1st Guards Battalion--a backwoods fight a mile from the main fighting.  

As the British moved through the woods, the contest reduced to small firefights, as the British forced the Virginians back.  Cornwallis, despite having a horse shot from under him, led the British clearing of the woods. The British then faced the Continentals in Greene's third line.

James Webster led the first British units out of the woods—the Jägers, the light infantry of the Guards, and the 33rd Foot—in a charge against the Continentals. The British were able to come within a  before they were repulsed by the Continental volley of the 1st Maryland and Delaware companies. However, as the 2nd Guards cleared the woods, they forced the 2nd Maryland to run and captured Finley's two six-pounders. The 1st Maryland then turned and engaged the 2nd Guards. William Washington's dragoons charged through the rear of the 2nd Guards, turned, and charged through the 2nd Guards a second time. A 1st Maryland bayonet charge followed Washington.

Cornwallis then ordered McLeod to fire grapeshot into the mass of fighting men. The grape killed Americans and British but cleared the field of both.  Cornwallis then advanced toward the gap left by the 2nd Maryland. At 3:30 P.M. Greene ordered his troops to withdraw under covering fire by the 4th Virginians. Cornwallis initially ordered a pursuit but recalled his men. In the words of Buchanan, "...reduced to slightly over 1400 effectives...Cornwallis, had ruined his army."

Aftermath

The battle lasted ninety minutes. The British engaged half as many as the Americans yet won possession of the battlefield. However, almost a quarter of the British became casualties. The Americans withdrew intact, which accomplished Greene's primary objective.

The British, by holding ground with their usual tenacity despite fewer troops, were victorious. However, Cornwallis suffered unsustainable casualties and subsequently withdrew to the coast to re-group, leaving the Americans with the strategic advantage. Seeing the Guilford battle as a classic Pyrrhic victory, British Whig Party leader and war critic Charles James Fox echoed Plutarch's famous quotation of Pyrrhus by saying, "Another such victory would ruin the British Army!"

In a letter to Lord George Germain delivered by Cornwallis's aide-de-camp, Captain Broderick, Cornwallis commented: "From our observation, and the best accounts we could procure, we did not doubt but the strength of the enemy exceeded 7,000 men...I cannot ascertain the loss of the enemy, but it must have been considerable; between 200 and 300 dead were left on the field of battle...many of their wounded escaped...Our forage parties have reported to me that houses in a circle six to eight miles around us are full of others...We took few prisoners."

Cornwallis wrote about the British force, "The conduct and actions of the officers and soldiers that composed this little army will do more justice to their merit than I can by words. Their persevering intrepidity in action, their invincible patience in the hardships and fatigues of a march of above 600 miles, in which they have forded several large rivers and numberless creeks, many of which would be reckoned large rivers in any other country in the world, without tents or covering against the climate, and often without provisions, will sufficiently manifest their ardent zeal for the honour and interests of their Sovereign and their country."

After the battle, the British occupied a large expanse of woodland that offered no food and shelter, and the night brought torrential rains. Fifty of the wounded died before sunrise. Had the British followed the retreating rebels, the redcoats might have come across the rebel baggage and supply wagons, which remained where the Americans had camped on the west bank of the Salisbury road prior to the battle.

On March 17, two days after the battle, Cornwallis reported his casualties as 3 officers and 88 men of other ranks killed, and 24 officers and 384 men of other ranks wounded, with a further 25 men missing in action. Webster was wounded during the battle and died two weeks later. Lieutenant-Colonel Tarleton, commander of the loyalist provincial British Legion, was another notable officer who was wounded, losing two fingers from taking a bullet in his right hand.

Greene reported his casualties as 57 killed, 111 wounded, and 161 missing among the Continental troops, and 22 killed, 74 wounded, and 885 missing for the militia--a total of 79 killed, 185 wounded, and 1,046 missing. Of those reported missing, 75 were wounded men who were captured by the British. When Cornwallis resumed his march, he left these 75 wounded prisoners at Cross Creek, Cornwallis having earlier left 70 of his own most severely wounded men at the Quaker settlement of New Garden near Snow Camp. An analysis of Revolutionary pension records by Lawrence E. Babits and Joshua B. Howard led the authors to conclude that Greene's killed and wounded at the Battle were "probably 15-20 percent higher than shown by official returns," with a likely "90-94 killed and 211-220 wounded." Apart from the wounded prisoners, most of the other men returned as 'missing' were North Carolina militiamen who returned to their homes after the battle.

To avoid another Camden, Greene retreated with his forces intact. With his small army, fewer than 2,000, Cornwallis declined to follow Greene into the back country. Retiring to Hillsborough, Cornwallis raised the royal standard, offered protection to loyalists, and for the moment appeared to be master of Georgia and the two Carolinas. In a few weeks, however, he abandoned the heart of the state and marched to the coast at Wilmington, North Carolina, where he could recruit and refit his army.

At Wilmington Cornwallis faced a serious problem. Instead of remaining in North Carolina, he wished to march into Virginia, justifying the move on the grounds that until he occupied Virginia, he could not firmly hold the more southerly states he had just overrun. General Clinton sharply criticized the decision as unmilitary and as having been made contrary to his instructions. To Cornwallis he wrote in May: "Had you intimated the probability of your intention, I should certainly have endeavoured to stop you, as I did then, as well as now, consider such a move likely to be dangerous to our interests in the Southern Colonies."  For three months, Cornwallis raided every farm or plantation he came across, from which he took hundreds of horses for his dragoons. He converted another 700 infantry to mounted troops. During these raids, he freed thousands of slaves, of whom 12,000 joined his own force.

General Greene boldly pushed toward Camden and Charleston, South Carolina with a view to drawing Cornwallis to the points where he was the year before, as well as driving back Lord Rawdon, whom Cornwallis had left in that field. In his main object—the recovery of the southern states—Greene succeeded by the close of the year, but not without hard fighting and reverses. Greene said, "We fight, get beat, rise, and fight again."

Legacy

Every year, on or about March 15, re-enactors in period uniforms present a tactical demonstration of Revolutionary War fighting techniques on or near the battle site, major portions of which are preserved in the Guilford Courthouse National Military Park, established in 1917. Recent research has shown that the battlefield extended into the area now within the boundaries of the adjacent Greensboro Country Park to the east.

Three current Army National Guard units (116th IN, 175th IN and 198th SIG) are derived from American units that participated in the Battle of Guilford Courthouse. There are only thirty Army National Guard and active Regular Army units with lineages that go back to the colonial era.

On Sunday, March 13, 2016, a Crown Forces Monument was opened at the Guilford Courthouse National Military Park in honor of the officers and men of Cornwallis's army.

The town of Gilford, New Hampshire, despite a clerical error in the spelling, is named after the battle. A New Hampshire historical marker there, number 118, commemorates the naming.

See also
 American Revolutionary War § War in the South. Places the Battle of Guilford Court House in overall sequence and strategic context.
 Snow Camp Outdoor Theater which tells some of the story of the aftermath of the battle through the play The Sword of Peace by William Hardy.

References

Further reading
Agniel, Lucien. The late affair has almost broke my heart;: The American Revolution in the South, 1780-1781 Chatham Press, 1972, .
Babits, Lawrence E. and Howard, Joshua B. Long, Obstinate, and Bloody: The Battle of Guilford Courthouse University of North Carolina Press, 2009, 
Baker, Thomas E.  Another Such Victory: The Story of the American Defeat at Guilford Courthouse that Helped Win the War for Independence Eastern National, 1999, .
Chidsey, Donald Barr. The war in the South: The Carolinas and Georgia in the American Revolution Crown Publishers, 1971.
Carolina Press, Chapel Hill and London, .
Davis, Burke. The Cowpens-Guilford Courthouse Campaign University of Pennsylvania Press, 2002, .
Hairr, John. Guilford Courthouse Da Capo Press, 2002, .
Konstam, Angus. Guilford Courthouse 1781: Lord Cornwallis's Ruinous Victory Osprey Publishing, 2002, .
Lumpkin, Henry. From Savannah to Yorktown: The American Revolution in the South Paragon House, 1987, .
Rodgers, H.C.B. "the British Army in the 18th Century" George Allen & Unwin Ltd., 1977
Sawicki, James A.  Infantry Regiments of the US Army.  Dumfries, VA: Wyvern Publications, 1981.  .
Showman, Richard K.; Conrad, Denis M.; Parks, Roger N. (editors). "The Papers of Nathanael Greene, Volume 7: 26 December 1780-29 March 1781." University of North Carolina Press. First Edition Printing (May 27, 1994).  
Trevelyan, Sir George O. "George the Third and Charles Fox: The Concluding Part of The American Revolution". New York and elsewhere: Longmans, Green and Co., 1914
Ward, Christopher. War of the Revolution (two volumes), MacMillan, New York, 1952

External links
Guilford Courthouse National Military Park website
Animation of the Battle of Guilford Courthouse 

1781 in the United States
Conflicts in 1781
Guilford Court House
Guilford Court House
Guilford Court House
Guilford Court House
History of Greensboro, North Carolina
1781 in North Carolina